A professional is someone who is skilled in a profession.

Professional or professionals may also refer to:

 Professional sports

Music
The Professionals (band), a British punk rock band formed in 1979
The Professionals (The Professionals album), a 1980 album by hard rock band The Professionals
The Professionals (Madlib and Oh No album)
The Professional (album), a 1998 DJ Clue album
The Professional 2, a 2000 DJ Clue album
"The Professional" (1988 song), a song by DJ Clue from his 1998 album The Professional
"The Professional" (2000 song), a song by Sleater-Kinney from their 2000 album All Hands on the Bad One
"Professional" (2013 song), a song by The Weeknd from his 2013 album Kiss Land

Film
 The Professionals (1960 film), a British crime thriller
 The Professionals (1966 film), an American western film
 The Professional (1981 film), a French action film
 Léon: The Professional, a 1994 French thriller
 The Professional (2003 film), a Serbian comedy/drama film

Other uses
The Professionals (TV series),  British crime-action television drama series
The Professional (novel), 2009 novel by Robert B. Parker
 The Professionals (Japanese documentary series), documentary series dubbed in English for NHK World-Japan, known in Japan as プロフェッショナル_仕事の流儀 (Professional Shigoto no Ryūgi)
Professionals Australia, employee association and trade union

See also

 
 
 
 
 Professional amateur (disambiguation)
 Pro (disambiguation)